The Phnom Penh City Bus is a municipal public transport system that serves Phnom Penh, the capital of Cambodia. The system opened to the public in September 2014 with 3 lines, other lines have been gradually added over the next several years. As of 2020, 17 lines run throughout the city. The system covers Prek Pnov (North), Ta Khmao (South), Chbar Ampov (East), and Special Economic Zone (West), there are plans to stretch the network outward.

The fare for the public buses is KHR1,500 (USD0.37) per voyage irrespective of distance. Senior citizens (age over 70), young children (under 1 meter), disabled, monks, teachers, and students travel for free, though they must confirm their identity. Since 1 September 2017, factory workers also travel for free and the exemption has been extended until 1 September 2021.

History 
The service is managed by the Phnom Penh Municipal Government. It is the second attempt by City Hall authorities and the Japan International Cooperation Agency (Jica) to launch a public bus service in Cambodia. A similar project 13 years ago was scrapped after just two months due to a lack of passengers.

 October 1, 2018 the City Hall launched 5 new lines on October 1, in addition to the previous 8 lines, giving a total of 13 city bus lines. Alteration and addition are as below:
 New lines: Line 4C, Line 10, Line 11, Line 12, Line 13.
 Lines with routes altered: Line 1 changed and separated to 1A, 1B; Line 2; Line 4B; Line 5; Line 6; Line 7; Line 8.

Lines

Line 01 

Line 01 is the first line established as part of the Phnom Penh bus rapid transit network on 5 February 2014. It runs North to Southeast and vice versa in the city.

Line 01 travels from Kilometer 9 Terminal, going south on National Road 5, circling Old Stadium Roundabout, traveling south alongside Monivong Boulevard (National Highway 1), passing Chbar Ampov Market, cuts across Kbal Thnal Stop, crosses Monivong Bridge, and ends at Boeung Chhouk Terminal.

Line 01 is one of the busiest lines because it connects Phnom Penh to Cbar Ampov.

Line 02 

Line 02 is one of the first 3 Line established as part of the Phnom Penh bus rapid transit network. It runs Northwest to South and vice versa in the city.

Line 02 begins from Aeon Mall 2 Terminal, going east on Oknha Mong Reththy Street (1928), cuts across Camko City Stop, around TVK Station, traveling east on Street 70, circling Old Stadium Roundabout, turns right on street 47, moving around Wat Phnom, going south of Norodom Boulevard (National Road 2), going around Independent Monument, crosses Kbal Thnal Sky Bridge, and arrives at Ta Khmao the capital of Kandal Province.

Line 02 is one of the busiest lines because it connects Phnom Penh to Ta Khmao.

Line 03 

Line 03 is one of the first 3 Line established as part of the Phnom Penh bus rapid transit network. It runs North to Southwest and vice versa in the city with a stop outside Phnom Penh International Airport.

Line 03 starts from Russey Keo Park Terminal, going south on National Road 5, circling Old Stadium Roundabout, going around Wat Phnom, moving south on Norodom Boulevard (National Road 2), around Central Market, traveling west alongside Kampuchea Krom Boulevard, crosses 7 Makara Sky Bridge, going west on Russian Federation Bouelevard, around Chaoum Chaou Circle Garden, moving south on National Road 3, and stops at Borey Santepheap 2 Terminal.

Line 03 is one of the busiest lines.

Line 4A 

Line 4A was added in August 2017 along other 7 lines. It runs Northeast to Southwest and vice versa in the city.

Line 4A starts from Russey Keo Park Terminal, going south on National Road 5, circling Old Stadium Roundabout, going around Wat Phnom, moving south on Norodom Boulevard (National Road 2), around Central Market, traveling southwest alongside Charles de Gaulle Street (217), crosses Kong Hing Stop, cuts across Olympic Water Reservoir Stop, going southwest alongside Monireth Boulevard (217), crossing Steung Mean Chey Sky Bridge, moving west on Veng Sreng Boulevard. turns left at Canadia Water Reservoir Stop, passing Toul Pongror Market, and stops at Borey Santepheap 2 Terminal.

Line 4A is one of the busiest lines because it lies on the factory zones which many factory workers use the city bus to go to work and return home.

Line 4B 

Line 4B was added in August 2017 along other 7 lines. It runs Northeast to Southwest and vice versa in the city.

Line 4B starts from Russey Keo Park Terminal, going south on National Road 5, circling Old Stadium Roundabout, going around Wat Phnom, moving south on Norodom Boulevard (National Road 2), around Central Market, traveling southwest alongside Charles de Gaulle Street (217), crosses Kong Hing Stop, cuts across Olympic Water Reservoir Stop, going southwest alongside Monireth Boulevard (217), crossing Steung Mean Chey Sky Bridge, moving west on Veng Sreng Boulevard, going around Chaom Chau Circle Garden, travelling west on National Road 4, and ends at Special Economic Zone Terminal.

Line 4B is one of the busiest lines because it lies on the factory zones which many factory workers use the city bus to go to work and return home.

Line 05 

Line 05 was added in August 2017 along other 7 lines. It runs North to Southeast and vice versa in the city.

Line 05 begins from Aeon Mall 2 Terminal, moving south of 1003 street, turns left to Road 1966, going left to Road 598, turning right to Road 337, turns right to Road 566, travelling south on Samdach Pen Nouth Street (289), going under Techno Sky Bridge, moving south passing Doeurm Kor Market then east alongside Mao Tse toung Boulevard (245), cuts across Bokor Stop, going north on Samdach Sothearos Boulevard (3), and arrives at Aeon Mall 1 Terminal.

Line 05 is usually busy around the evening period and Sunday due to people going to Aeon Malls.

Line 06 

Line 06 was added in August 2017 along other 7 lines. It runs Northeast to Southwest and vice versa in the city.

Line 06 travels from Borey Rung Roeung Terminal, moving south alongside National Road 6, crossing Chroy Changvar Bridge, circling Old Stadium Roundabout, going west on Street 70, around TVK Station, cuts across Camko City Stop, travelling west on Oknha Mong Reththy Street (1928), turns left to Oknha Try Heng Street (2011), moving east on Russian Federation Boulevard, and terminates at Century Plaza Market terminal.

Line 7A 

Line 7A was added in August 2017 along other 7 lines. It runs North to South and vice versa in the city.

Line 7A leaves from Kilometer 9 Terminal, moving north on National Road 5, travelling south alongside Chea Sophara Street (598), going under 7 Makara Sky Bridge, moving south on Yothapol Khemarak Phoumin Boulevard (271), turns left to Oknha Tep Phan Street (182) passes Depo Market, crosses Kong Hing Stop, passing Orussey Market, turns right to Monivong Boulevard (National Highway 1), turns right to Preah Sihanouk Boulevard (274), going around Independent Monument, turns right to Norodom Boulevard (National Highway 2), turns left to Oknha Chrun You Hak Street (294), moving south of Samdach Sothearos Boulevard (3), and arrives at Aeon Mall 1 terminal.

Line 7B 

Line 7B was added in August 2017 along other 7 lines. It runs North to South and vice versa in the city.

Line 7B leaves from Kilometer 9 Terminal, moving north on National Road 5, travelling south alongside Chea Sophara Street (598), going under 7 Makara Sky Bridge, moving south on Yothapol Khemarak Phoumin Boulevard (271), crosses Steung Mean Chey Sky Bridge, cuts across Kbal Thnal Stop, crosses Monivong Bridge, and stops at Chbar Ampov Terminal.

Line 08 

Line 08 was added in August 2017 along other 7 lines. It runs West to East and vice versa in the city.

Line 08 starts from Kilometer 9 Terminal, going north on National Road 5, crosses Prek Pnov Bridge, moving alongside Ly Yongphat Street, travelling south on National Road 6, and ends at Borey Rung Roeung Terminal.

Line 09 

Line 09 was added in January 2018. It runs East to West and vice versa in the city.

Line 09 begins from Borey Santepheap 2 Terminal, moving south on National Road 3, reaches Vattanac Industrial Park 2 then makes a U-turn, turns left to Prateah Lang Street, and stops at Special Economic Zone Terminal.

See also 
 Phnom Penh
 Transport in Phnom Penh
 List of bus rapid transit systems

References

External links 
 Cambodians board Phnom Penh's first public buses in more than a decade, The Guardian
 "Public Bus System Works, But Needs Improvement, Riders Say"
 Official Facebook Page of Phnom Penh City Bus Services

 
21st century in Phnom Penh
Cambodian companies established in 2014
Transport companies established in 2014
Companies of Cambodia
Companies based in Phnom Penh